Zheng Xincong (born November 1963) is a Chinese politician, currently serving as director of the Macau Liaison Office.

He was a delegate to the 12th National People's Congress. He was a representative of the 19th National Congress of the Chinese Communist Party. He is a representative of the 20th National Congress of the Chinese Communist Party and a member of the 20th Central Committee of the Chinese Communist Party.

Early life and education
Zheng was born in Xianyou County, Fujian, in November 1963, and graduated from the Party School of Fujian Provincial Committee of the Chinese Communist Party.

Political career
Zheng joined the Chinese Communist Party (CCP) in December 1986.

Zheng worked in Sanming Cement Plant (now Sanming Building Materials Corporation) for a long time, and eventually becoming party secretary in December 1996.

Since 1998, Zheng successively served as deputy party secretary and deputy magistrate of Datian County (1998–2001), director of Sanming Municipal Economic and Trade Commission (2001–2003), secretary-general of Sanming Municipal People's Government (2003–2006), deputy director of Fujian Provincial Economic and Trade Commission (2006–2008), general manager and party secretary of Fujian Shipbuilding Industry Group (2007–2008), and deputy secretary-general of Fujian Provincial People's Government (2008–2010).

In July 2010, Zheng became vice mayor of Quanzhou, rising to mayor in February 2013. He also served as mayor of Ningde from December 2011 to February 2013. He was party secretary of Quanzhou in June 2015, in addition to serving as chairman of Quanzhou Municipal People's Congress. He was elevated to vice governor of Fujian in January 2018. He was appointed secretary-general of the CCP Fujian Provincial Committee in May 2019 and was admitted to member of the Standing Committee of the CCP Fujian Provincial Committee, the province's top authority. In April 2021, he succeeded Zhao Long as executive vice governor of Fujian, but having held the position for only three months.

In July 2021, Zheng was chosen as deputy director of the Macau Liaison Office, and rose to director in May 2022. He is also the adviser on National Security Affairs to the Committee for the Maintenance of National Security of the Macau Special Administrative Region.

References

1963 births
Living people
People from Xianyou County
Mayors of Quanzhou
Mayors of Ningde
People's Republic of China politicians from Fujian
Chinese Communist Party politicians from Fujian
Members of the 20th Central Committee of the Chinese Communist Party
Delegates to the 12th National People's Congress